Fallicambarus tenuis is a species of crayfish in the genus Fallicambarus in the family Cambaridae. It was the only species in the subgenus Procambarus (Tenuicambarus) before DNA analysis suggested a reclassification.

Fallicambarus tenuis is rare throughout its range, which is restricted to the Ouachita Mountains of Le Flore County, Oklahoma and Polk County, Arkansas.

References

Cambaridae
Endemic fauna of the United States
Ouachita Mountains
Natural history of Oklahoma
Natural history of Arkansas
Freshwater crustaceans of North America
Crustaceans described in 1950
Taxa named by Horton H. Hobbs Jr.